Nicola Zanon is an Italian-Thai alpine skier who competed for Thailand at the 2018 Winter Olympics.

Career
Zanon was born on 14 December 1996 to an Italian father and a Thai mother and grew up in Val di Rabbi in Trentino. He started skiing at age eight at the Madonna di Campiglio.

He previously attempted to qualify for the 2014 Winter Olympics in Sochi, Russia but failed, leading to his retirement and to work as a woodworker with his father. However, he came out of retirement when the Ski and Snowboard Association of Thailand in February 2017 offered him a chance to compete at the 2018 Winter Olympics for the Southeast Asian nation. He participated in races in Argentina, Chile, and Italy to qualify for the Olympics.

Before he participated in the 2018 Winter Olympics in Pyeongchang, South Korea, he trained at the Piste Azzurre in Val di Fassa under coach Stefano Vampa. In the men's giant slalom event held on 18 February he did not finish in the first run.

References

1996 births
Living people
Sportspeople from Trentino
Nicola Zanon
Italian people of Thai descent
Italian male alpine skiers
Nicola Zanon
Nicola Zanon
Alpine skiers at the 2018 Winter Olympics
Alpine skiers at the 2022 Winter Olympics